Sardinia is an island in the Mediterranean Sea.

Sardinia may also refer to:

Island of Sardinia
Politics of Sardinia
Elections in Sardinia
List of presidents of Sardinia
List of political parties in Sardinia
Music of Sardinia
People from Sardinia
History of Sardinia
The Kingdom of Sardinia, a former Spanish and Savoyard kingdom
List of monarchs of Sardinia
List of viceroys of Sardinia
History of mining in Sardinia
History of the Jews in Sardinia
Languages of Sardinia
List of tourist attractions in Sardinia
List of archaeological and artistic sites of Sardinia

Places in the United States
Sardinia, Indiana
Sardinia, New York
Sardinia, Ohio

Other
Sardinia (plant genus), a former genus in the family Rubiaceae

See also

Sardina (disambiguation)
Sardine (disambiguation)
Ichnusa (disambiguation)